Women's Hospital International and Fertility Centre (WHI&FC), is a private specialized healthcare facility in Uganda. It specializes in the treatment of infertile couples.

Location
The hospital is located on the Bukoto–Kisaasi Road, in the neighborhood called Bukoto, in the city of Kampala, Uganda's capital. The coordinates of Women's Hospital International and Fertility Centre are: 0°21'02.0"N, 32°35'57.0"E (Latitude:0.350552; Longitude:32.599165).

Overview
WHI&FC was established in 2004. The hospital offers services in gynaecology, maternity and fertility in the countries of the East African Community and the Great Lakes region. The hospital is credited with the conception and delivery of the first in vitro baby in Uganda. Since then, at least such 10,000 such babies had been conceived and delivered at the hospital, as of December 2017. In November 2009, a 54 year old mother delivered a healthy in vitro baby at WHI&FC.

Services offered
, the following services are available at WHI&FC. The list is not exhaustive: 
1. Antenatal Care 2. Labor and delivery 3. Cesarean birth 4. Postnatal care 5. Gynecological laparoscopy 6. Laparoscopic surgery 7. In vitro conception 8. Surrogate conception 9. Investigation of infertility in men and women

Other considerations
WHI&FC maintains a subsidiary clinic in Kigali, Rwanda, known as Kigali IVF and Fertility Clinic, opened in 2014.

See also
 Kampala Capital City Authority
 List of hospitals in Uganda
 International Hospital Kampala
 Nakasero Hospital
 Mulago National Referral Hospital

References

External links
 Official Website
 Opinion: Yes, we make babies in test tubes As of 6 September 2021.

Hospitals established in 2004
2004 establishments in Uganda
Hospitals in Kampala
Kampala Central Division
Kampala Capital City Authority